Agudat Sport Nordia Jerusalem, also known as Beitar Nordia Jerusalem is an Israeli football club based in Jerusalem. The club was formed in 2014 by Beitar Jerusalem supporters who are against violence and against racism, opposed to the La Familia supporter's group which took over the fan base in the years prior to the clubs' formation.

Origins and formation 
Beitar Jerusalem was established in 1936 and since the 1970s became a major force in Israeli football, winning 6 championships, 7 state cups, as well as several minor cups and spending most of its time in the Israeli top division.

Established in 2005, fan organization La Familia became dominant in the stands, voicing more racist views, edging out less extreme fans. As a result, in 2014, the disenfranchised fans organized a fans' association, named Beitar Nordia Jerusalem, in order to set a fan-owned football club. The club was initially called Beitar Nordia Jerusalem, after Zionist leader Max Nordau. By doing this, the club resurrected the original club's name between 1947 and 1948, as Nordia was the name chosen by the Beitar sport association teams after the association was disbanded by the Mandatory Palestine government due to the association's ties with the Irgun in 1947.

In August 2014 the club was registered with the IFA. However, the club was barred from using Beitar in its name, as it is not affiliated with the Beitar sport association. The club, therefore, settled on the name "Agudat Sport Nordia Jerusalem", and was registered to the Central division of Liga Gimel. On 17 October 2014 the club played it first official match, beating Maccabi Kiryat Ekron 2–1 in the league.

Honours

League

Cups

Current squad
 As to 19 September 2021

References

External links
Agudat Sport Nordia Jerusalem Israel Football Association 
Nordia 

2014 establishments in Israel
Association football clubs established in 2014
Jerusalem, Agudat Sport Nordia
Beitar Jerusalem F.C.
Sport in Jerusalem
Fan-owned football clubs